Barry Zane Posner (born March 11, 1949)  is  the Accolti Professor of Leadership at the Leavey School of Business at Santa Clara University.

Early life and education

Posner received a B.A. degree in political science from the  University of California, Santa Barbara in 1970, a M.A. from The Ohio State University in  Public Administration in 1972, and a Ph.D in Organizational Behavior and Administrative Theory from the University of Massachusetts, Amherst in 1976;. His doctoral thesis was "Characteristics of individuals' control in organizations"

Career

Posner is the Accolti Professor of Leadership at the Leavey School of Business at Santa Clara University. He also  serves on the advisory board of the Global Women's Leadership Network. He has spoken about leadership at the University of St. Thomas.
He spent 6 months as visiting professor at the Hong Kong University of Science and Technology. His work has been featured in The Washington Post. His research includes exploring positive leadership traits that lead to successful leaders. He also has studied the key components of successful business projects.

The Leadership Challenge
 
Posner and James M. Kouzes started developing the idea for The Leadership Challenge when they were planned to present about leadership at a two-day conference. Academics at Santa Clara University, Kouzes and Posner were set to speak after Tom Peters, who was presenting about successful companies. Kouzes and Posner decided to focus on individual leadership skills. The name for the book came from the concept of the challenges that take place to "make extraordinary things happen," according to Kouzes in 2012. The Leadership Challenge uses case studies to examine "The Five Practices of Exemplary Leadership," as researched and developed by Kouzes and Posner. Their first surveys for the five practices started in 1983, by asking people "What do you do as a leader when you're performing at your personal best?" Over 30 years, they have done thousands of interviews and collected approximately 75,000 written responses. Kouzes and Posner identified five common concepts in their survey, hence the five practices. The "Five Practices" are: "Model the Way," "Inspire a Shared Vision," "Challenge the Process," "Enable Others to Act," and "Encourage the Heart". Posner has published, alongside Kouzes, articles about The Leadership Challenge in Fast Company.

Bibliography

"A Leadership Development Instrument for Students: Updated". Journal of College Student Development. Volume 45, Number 4, July/August 2004: 443–456.

With James K. Kouzes

with John C. Maxwell. Christian Reflections on The Leadership Challenge. Hoboken: Jossey-Bass (2004). 
Encouraging the Heart: A Leader's Guide to Rewarding and Recognizing Others. Hoboken: Jossey-Bass (2003). 
with Elaine Biech. A Coach's Guide to Developing Exemplary Leaders: Making the Most of The Leadership Challenge and the Leadership Practices Inventory. Hoboken: Pfeiffer (2010)
Credibility: How Leaders Gain and Lose It, Why People Demand It. Hoboken: Jossey-Bass (1993). 
A Leader's Legacy. Hoboken: Jossey-Bass (2006). 
The Leadership Challenge: Activities Book. Hoboken: Pfeiffer (2010). 
The Leadership Challenge: How to Make Extraordinary Things Happen in Organizations. Hoboken: Jossey-Bass (2012). The Leadership Challenge Workbook. Hoboken: Jossey-Bass (2012). 
with Elaine Biech. A Coach's Guide to Developing Exemplary Leaders: Making the Most of The Leadership Challenge and the Leadership Practices Inventory (LPI). Hoboken: Pfeiffer (2010). 
with Steven J. DeKrey. Making Extraordinary Things Happen in Asia: Applying The Five Practices of Exemplary Leadership. Hoboken: Jossey-Bass (2013). The Student Leadership Challenge: Five Practices for Exemplary Leaders. Hoboken: Jossey-Bass (2009). 
with Beth High and Gary M. Morgan. The Student Leadership Challenge: Facilitation and Activity Guide. Hoboken: Jossey-Bass (2013) 
with Beth High and Gary M. Morgan. The Student Leadership Challenge: Student Workbook and Personal Leadership Journal. Hoboken: Jossey-Bass (2013). 
with Joe Frontiera and Daniel Leidl. Team Turnarounds: A Playbook for Transforming Underperforming Teams. Hoboken: Jossey-Bass (2012). The Truth about Leadership: The No-fads, Heart-of-the-Matter Facts You Need to Know''. Hoboken: Jossey-Bass (2010). 
"We Lead from the Inside Out," The Journal of Values-Based Leadership: Vol. 1: Iss. 1, Article 5. 2008.

References

Santa Clara University School of Business faculty
Leadership scholars
University of California, Santa Barbara alumni
Living people
1949 births